The MacNaughton Cup is a trophy awarded annually to the regular season conference champion of the Central Collegiate Hockey Association (CCHA). The trophy is named after James MacNaughton of Calumet, Michigan, who was a supporter of amateur ice hockey.  The Cup is hand crafted of pure silver and stands almost three-feet high and weighs nearly 40 pounds.

History
In 1913, MacNaughton purchased a cup trophy for US$2,000 and donated it to the President of the American Hockey Association, which was to be awarded to the league's champion at the end of the season.  The MacNaughton Cup remained with the American Hockey Association until 1932.  From 1933 to 1950, the Cup was given to semi-pro and intermediate hockey teams in Michigan's Copper Country.

In 1951, the MacNaughton family arranged to have the Cup awarded to the newly founded Midwest Collegiate Hockey League (MCHL), a precursor to the WCHA.  The MCHL was composed of Michigan Tech, Colorado College, University of Denver, University of Michigan, Michigan State University, University of Minnesota, and University of North Dakota.  Michigan Tech became the trustee for the Cup. In the original spirit of the trophy, the league decided to award the trophy to its regular season champion.

In 1953, the MCHL became the Western Intercollegiate Hockey League (WIHL).  The Cup remained a part of the WIHL until the league was disbanded in March 1958.  There was no league play for the 1958–59 season, and for the 1959–60 season the seven teams resumed competition under the new name of the Western Collegiate Hockey Association.

From the 1961–62 through the 1964–65 seasons, the Cup was awarded to the WCHA's playoff tournament champion instead of the regular season champion, but the WCHA resumed awarding the Cup to the regular season Champion again for the start of the 1965–66 season through the 1981–82 season.

Michigan Tech left the WCHA to join the Central Collegiate Hockey Association (CCHA) for the 1981–82 season.  Since Michigan Tech is the trustee of the Cup, the Cup went to the CCHA. The Broadmoor Trophy was created as a replacement and awarded to the regular season champion until Michigan Tech returned to the WCHA for the start of the 1984–85 season.  The MacNaughton Cup also returned and continued to be awarded to the regular season champion through the final WCHA men's season in 2020–21.

On May 18, 2021, it was announced that the trophy would be returning to the re-formed CCHA, beginning with the 2021–22 season.

Champions

North Dakota's 14 MacNaughton Cups led the WCHA. Denver and Minnesota are tied for second, with 13 MacNaughton Cups. Bowling Green was the first school to win the cup 3 straight times. They were later supplanted by Minnesota State, who has 6 consecutive wins as of 2023.

Winners

Wins by team (college era)

 shared title
 * Currently compete in CCHA

See also
Western Collegiate Hockey Association men's champions

References

Central Collegiate Hockey Association
Western Collegiate Hockey Association
College ice hockey trophies and awards in the United States